Pamela Susan Shoop (born June 7, 1948) is an American character actress in films and on television. She often appeared on television series created by Glen A. Larson. She is known for her role in Halloween II (1981) as Nurse Karen Bailey.

Early years 
Shoop is the daughter of actress Julie Bishop and test pilot Clarence A. Shoop (who was an executive at Hughes Aircraft Company and commander of the California Air National Guard). As a Major General in World War II, he flew the first photographic reconnaissance mission over Omaha Beach on D-Day.

She studied acting at University of Southern California and at Villa Mercede in Florence, Italy.

Career 
Shoop had her first stage role as the only female in a production of Generation, which opened January 30, 1968 at the Sombrero Playhouse in Phoenix, Arizona. Her father died during the rehearsals, but her mother Julie Bishop, and the play's director and star Robert Cummings, urged her to stay with the week-long production. Her screen debut came in the short film Frog Story.

Shoop's best known film role was in the horror film Halloween II (1981) as Nurse Karen Bailey.

On television, Shoop starred on NBC's Return to Peyton Place as Alison MacKenzie Tate #2 from 1973-1974, taking over the role from Katherine Glass, and she had the role of Miss Dorothy Carlyle on Galactica 1980. She appeared in the pilot episode of Knight Rider ("Knight of the Phoenix") and later on in the season four premiere ("Knight of the Juggernaut"). She also appeared in the pilot episode of Magnum, P.I.

Other guest appearances include The Mod Squad, B. J. and the Bear, Buck Rogers in the 25th Century, Simon & Simon, Wonder Woman, The Incredible Hulk and Murder, She Wrote. Shoop's last credited appearance was a 1996 episode of Kung Fu: The Legend Continues, but she continues to attend conventions associated with films in which she appeared. She appeared in the 2006 DVD release Halloween: 25 Years of Terror.

Personal life
On November 15, 1987, Shoop married Terrance Sweeney, a former Jesuit priest, in Pacific Palisades, Los Angeles. Together, they wrote What God Hath Joined.

Shoop works with charitable groups, including Good Tidings, the National Charity League, and Achievement Rewards for College Scientists.

Filmography

Film

Television

Books

References

External links
 Official website
 
 
 

1948 births
Living people
Actresses from Los Angeles
American film actresses
American stage actresses
American television actresses
University of Southern California alumni
20th-century American actresses
21st-century American women